Whole Earth may refer to:

Publications
Whole Earth Catalog (1968–1972, and afterwards occasionally up to 1988), U.S. life-style and environmental periodical edited by Stewart Brand
Whole Earth Discipline (published 2009), book by Stewart Brand
Whole Earth Review (1985–2002, but renamed simply "Whole Earth" after 1997), U.S. scientific and political periodical edited by Stewart Brand
Whole Earth Software Catalog and Review (1984–1985), two separate U.S. software periodicals (the "Catalog" and the "Review") edited by Stewart Brand

Other
Whole Earth Access (1969–1998), U.S. counterculture retail store chain created by Stewart Brand
Whole Earth Blazar Telescope (founded 1997), international consortium of astronomers and astrophysicists

See also
Stewart Brand (born 1938), U.S. author, editor, and environmentalist associated with the "whole earth" movement